John Samuel McConnell (born December 31, 1975) is a former Major League Baseball pitcher. He played during one season at the major league level for the Atlanta Braves.

McConnell attended Ball State University, and in 1996 he played collegiate summer baseball with the Harwich Mariners of the Cape Cod Baseball League.

He was selected by the Pittsburgh Pirates in the 11th round of the 1997 MLB Draft. McConnell was released by the Pirates during spring training , and signed with the Philadelphia Phillies the next day.

References

External links

1975 births
Living people
Ball State Cardinals baseball players
Major League Baseball pitchers
Atlanta Braves players
Erie SeaWolves players
Augusta GreenJackets players
Lynchburg Hillcats players
Carolina Mudcats players
Altoona Curve players
Nashville Sounds players
Greenville Braves players
Richmond Braves players
Somerset Patriots players
Harwich Mariners players
Baseball players from Cincinnati